5tion is a South Korean boy band popular during the early 2000s. The group's name is pronounced ocean as a play on words with the Korean word for '5' being 'oh'.

History
In 2004, two members Lee Hyun & Hwang Sung-hwan (John) spun off into a project group called 'After Rain'.

In mid-2010, Hwang Sung-hwan (John) departed and formed 2NISE with Hohyeon & Jogeun.

Later in September 2010, 5tion made a comeback as a three-member group consisting of Hwang Sung-hwan (John), Lee Hyun & Woo Il.

In March 2012, the group made another comeback with a new member roster and stage names, reuniting three original members (Oh Byung-jin, Lee Hyun & Son Il-kwon) with two new members (LEN & Boseok). Wanting to reach out to the international fanbase, member names were changed to be more foreign sounding. Oh Byung-jin would be known as 'Cain', Son Il-kwon would be 'Roy' and Lee Hyun was shortened to 'Hyun'. Originally a ballad group, the return saw a change to dance music.

On January 15, 2017, the group was involved in a car crash while performing in Japan. This occurred when the van slid on an icy road and into a delivery truck; they were immediately rushed to the hospital, and none of the group members were later reported to have had any serious injuries. 

After two years of inactivity, on April 29 2022, they announced a comeback through a live concert called "COME BACK" in Tokyo being on May 6 2022 followed by Live in OSAKA on May 14 and 15, 2022.

Members

Current
 Il Kwon 
 Chang Woo 
 Ju Ho 
 Jun Young 
 Jun Ho

Former
 Taekyung (태경) 
 Chanmin (찬민) 
 Seokho (석호) 
 Minsung (민성) 
 John (존) 
 Hyun (현) 
 Boseok (보석) 
 Wooil (우일) 
 Kyne (카인) 
 Len (렌) 
 Noa (노아) 
 Marine (마린)

Timeline

Discography

Studio albums

Extended plays

Singles

Soundtrack appearances

References

External links
 

South Korean pop music groups
South Korean boy bands
Musical quartets
Musical groups established in 2001
2001 establishments in South Korea